Acer miaoshanicum is an uncommon Asian species of maple. It has been found only in southern China (Guangxi and Guizhou).

Acer miaoshanicum is a small tree up to 4 meters tall, with gray bark. Leaves are non-compound, thin and papery, up to 10 cm wide and 12 cm across, with 5 lobes but occasionally 3.

References

External links
line drawing for Flora of China drawings 3 + 4 at bottom

miaoshanicum
Plants described in 1966
Flora of Guizhou
Flora of Guangxi